The FIS Freestyle Ski World Cup is an annual freestyle skiing competition arranged by the International Ski Federation since 1980. Currently six disciplines are included in world cup: moguls, aerials, ski cross, halfpipe, slopestyle and big air. In the 1980s and 1990s there were also ski ballet and combined, which no longer exist.

Races are hosted primarily at ski resorts in North America, the Alps in Europe, with regular stops in Scandinavia, east Asia, but a few races have also been held in the Southern Hemisphere. World Cup competitions have been hosted in 22 countries around the world: Australia, Austria, Belarus, Canada, China, Croatia, Czech Republic, Finland, France, Germany, Italy, Japan,  New Zealand, Norway, Russia, Slovenia, South Korea, Spain, Sweden, Switzerland, Ukraine and the United States. (note that all world cup races hosted at ski resort in Ukraine was still part of Soviet Union respectively.)

Number of events 
Mixed team events are not included in this list.

Men

Women

Points distribution

Overall results

Men

Women

Top 10 podiums
Updated after 2017–18 season.

Most overall World Cup titles
The following skiers have at least 3 overall Freestyle World Cup titles:

Men
9:  Mikael Kingsbury

5:  Éric Laboureix

Ladies
10:  Conny Kissling

4:  Hannah Kearney

3:  Ophélie David,  Jacqui Cooper,  Kari Traa

Most discipline World Cup titles
The records for most World Cup titles in each discipline are as follows:

See also
 Freestyle skiing
 Freestyle skiing at the Winter Olympics
 FIS Freestyle World Ski Championships

References

External links
fis-ski.com FIS Freestyle News, Calendar, Rules and Results

 
Freestyle skiing competitions
Freestyle
International Ski Federation competitions
Skiing world competitions